There are at least 86 named mountains in Mineral County, Montana.
 Bald Hill, el. 
 Bald Mountain, el. 
 Bear Point, el. 
 Black Peak, el. 
 Blacktail Mountain, el. 
 Boyd Mountain, el. 
 Brooks Mountain, el. 
 Cameron Peak, el. 
 Cedar Peak, el. 
 Chimney Rock, el. 
 Cobden Peak, el. 
 Cold Peak, el. 
 Crater Mountain, el. 
 Cruzane Mountain, el. 
 Cyr Peak, el. 
 Deer Peak, el. 
 Dominion Peak, el. 
 Drury Peak, el. 
 Eagle Peak, el. 
 Eagle Rock, el. 
 Flattop Mountain, el. 
 Ford Hill, el. 
 Goat Mountain, el. 
 Gold Peak, el. 
 Graham Mountain, el. 
 Granite Peak, el. 
 Graves Peak, el. 
 Greenwood Hill, el. 
 Haugan Mountain, el. 
 Hawk Mountain, el. 
 Hemlock Mountain, el. 
 Henderson Hill, el. 
 Illinois Peak, el. 
 Keystone Peak, el. 
 Landowner Mountain, el. 
 Lightning Peak, el. 
 Lion Point, el. 
 Little Joe Mountain, el. 
 Little Phoebe Mountain, el. 
 Lookout Mountain, el. 
 Lost Peak, el. 
 Magone Mountain, el. 
 Martel Mountain, el. 
 McGee Peak, el. 
 McMullan Peak, el. 
 Meadow Mountain, el. 
 Miller Mountain, el. 
 Mint Peak, el. 
 Moon Peak, el. 
 Mount Baldy, el. 
 Needle Point, el. 
 Newman Peak, el. 
 Olson Peak, el. 
 Oregon Peak, el. 
 Petes Point, el. 
 Prospect Mountain Number One, el. 
 Prospect Mountain Number Two, el. 
 Quartz Peak, el. 
 Red Hill, el. 
 Rivers Peak, el. 
 Rivulet Peak, el. 
 Rock Creek Vista, el. 
 Round Mountain, el. 
 Runt Mountain, el. 
 Saint Patrick Peak, el. 
 Saltese Mountain, el. 
 Schley Mountain, el. 
 Shale Mountain, el. 
 Sheep Mountain, el. 
 Stark Mountain, el. 
 Storm Peak, el. 
 Straight Peak, el. 
 Sunrise Mountain, el. 
 Sunrise Point, el. 
 Sunset Peak, el. 
 Taft Peak, el. 
 Tamarack Hill, el. 
 Tarbox Hill, el. 
 Thompson Peak, el. 
 Torino Peak, el. 
 Up Up Mountain, el. 
 Van Ness Point, el. 
 Wade Peak, el. 
 Ward Peak, el. 
 White Mountain, el. 
 Williams Peak, el.

See also
 List of mountains in Montana
 List of mountain ranges in Montana

Notes

Mineral